Orlande de Lassus (c. 1532 – 1594) was a 16th-century composer

Lassus may also refer to:

People
 Kristiina Lassus (born 1966), a Finnish product designer and interior architect
 Jean-Baptiste Lassus (1807–1857), a French architect
 Oriane Lassus (born 1987), French author, cartoonist, illustrator
 Pierre Lassus (1741–1807), a French surgeon

Other
 Amblyseius lassus
 De Lassus, Missouri
 Lassus Mountains
 Tramont-Lassus

See also
 Lassas